David Sadler may refer to:
 David Sadler (footballer) (born 1946), former English footballer
 David Sadler (geographer) (born 1960), British geographer and researcher
 David Sadler (yacht designer) (1921–2014), British yacht designer

See also 
 Sadler (name)